Edgar Coleman is an American classical pianist.

The multi-talented virtuoso was a pupil of Ozan Marsh, Aube Tzerko (renowned piano teacher and student of Artur Schnabel).

Mr. Coleman began piano studies at the age of four.  After only a few years of intensive instruction with Mary Ann Craft (student of Ernest Hutcheson of the Juilliard School), Coleman made his piano debut at the age of seven playing a recital program of Haydn Sonatas for the Beethoven Club.

Upon hearing Mr. Coleman play, Harold C. Schonberg, chief music critic of The New York Times, commented that Edgar is "a moving force of nature with a huge, beautiful sound.  His interpretation of the Prokofiev 3rd Concerto is most brilliant ... almost demonic."  Conductor, Alan Balter, exclaimed Coleman's interpretation of the Romantic literature as being "a rich, lyrically sensuous sound that is emotionally compelling."

American classical pianists
American male classical pianists
Year of birth missing
Possibly living people